Riccardo Nencini (born 19 October 1959) is an Italian politician.

Nencini was born at Barberino di Mugello, in the province of Florence. He is the nephew of professional cyclist Gastone Nencini, winner of the 1960 Tour de France. A long-time member of the Italian Socialist Party (PSI), he joined the Italian Socialists (SI) in 1994 and the Italian Democratic Socialists (SDI) in 1998.

From 1994 to 1999 he was member of the European Parliament. From 2000 to 2010 he was President of the Regional Council of Tuscany.

On 5 July 2008 he became Secretary of the Italian Socialist Party.

In 2013 Nencini was elected to the Chamber of Deputies among the ranks of the Democratic Party. From 28 February 2014 to 1 June 2018 he served as Deputy Minister of Infrastructure and Transport in the governments led by Matteo Renzi and Paolo Gentiloni.

In the 2018 general election he was elected Senator in the uninominal constituency of Arezzo.

In 2019 he left the office of PSI Secretary and was appointed President of the party.

References

1959 births
Living people
People from Barberino di Mugello
Transport ministers of Italy
Presidents of Italian regional councils
Members of the Regional Council of Tuscany
MEPs for Italy 1994–1999
Deputies of Legislature XI of Italy
Senators of Legislature XVIII of Italy
Italian Socialist Party politicians
Italian Socialists politicians
Italian Democratic Socialists MEPs
Italian Socialist Party (2007) politicians
Leaders of political parties